The 1946 Appalachian State Mountaineers football team was an American football team that represented Appalachian State Teachers College (now known as Appalachian State University) as a member of the North State Conference during the 1946 college football season. In their second year under head coach Flucie Stewart, the Mountaineers compiled an overall record of 6–3, with a mark of 4–1 in conference play, and finished 2nd in the NSC.

Schedule

References

Appalachian State
Appalachian State Mountaineers football seasons
Appalachian State Mountaineers football